A Shot in the Dark is a 1935 American mystery film directed by Charles Lamont.

Plot
A college student (Charles Starrett) discovers his roommate's body hanging from a window and calls the police. What at first looks like suicide turns out to be murder.  While a police investigation is ongoing, more students are killed.

Cast 
Charles Starrett as Kenneth "Ken" Harris
Robert Warwick as Joseph Harris
Edward Van Sloan as Prof. Bostwick
Marion Shilling as Jean Coates
Helen Jerome Eddy as Miss Lottie Case
Doris Lloyd as Lucille Coates
James Bush as Byron Coates / John Meseraux
Julian Madison as Charlie Penlon
Eddie Tamblyn as Bill Smart
Ralph Brooks as Sam Anderson
Robert McKenzie as Sheriff
John Davidson as Prof. Brand
Herbert Bunston as College President
George Morrell as Deputy Ab Barber
Broderick O'Farrell as Dr. Howell
Jane Keckley as Bostwick's Housekeeper

Critical reception
The New York Times wrote, "A Shot in the Dark, which pictures a trilogy of murders on a rural college campus, telegraphs its punches in a way that may seem insignificant to Chesterfield Productions, Inc., but is as good as a confession to us amateur gumshoes...a decided absence of liveliness both in the writing and the playing"; whereas Fantastic Movie Musings and Ramblings noted, "a very good mystery...It does have some problems, particularly in having a rather stiff and static presentation, but outside of that, this is one of the more pleasant discoveries I've made."

References

External links 

The AFI Catalog of Feature Films:A Shot in the Dark

1935 films
American mystery films
Films based on American novels
Films directed by Charles Lamont
American black-and-white films
Chesterfield Pictures films
Films set in universities and colleges
1935 mystery films
1930s English-language films
1930s American films